Françoise Borie (born 16 February 1947) is a French former swimmer. She competed in the women's 100 metre backstroke at the 1964 Summer Olympics.

References

External links
 

1947 births
Living people
Olympic swimmers of France
Swimmers at the 1964 Summer Olympics
Universiade medalists in swimming
Place of birth missing (living people)
Universiade gold medalists for France
French female backstroke swimmers
Medalists at the 1965 Summer Universiade
Medalists at the 1967 Summer Universiade